Nikolayenko is a Ukrainian surname, derived from the given name Nikolay (Nicholas). Notable people with the surname include: 

Oleksandra Nikolayenko, Ukrainian model and actress
Vitaly Nikolayenko, Russian natural scientist and photographer
Stanislav Nikolaenko, Ukrainian politician

See also
 

Ukrainian-language surnames
Patronymic surnames
Surnames from given names